Annie Last (born 7 September 1990), is an English professional cyclist, representing Great Britain and England, who specialises in mountain biking and cyclo-cross. She was chosen as a female competitor in the cross country mountain bike event for the Great Britain team at the 2012 Summer Olympics, going on to take 8th place.

Last won the silver medal in the mountain bike cross-country event at the 2017 UCI Mountain Bike World Championships, before taking the gold medal in the same event at the 2018 Commonwealth Games. She competed at the 2018 Cross Country European Championships.

Career
Last was introduced to mountain biking by her father and brother, Tom as she accompanied them on racing trips. In 2009, she joined the British Cycling Olympic Academy programme, and was originally expected to be a potential athlete for the 2016 Summer Olympics. During the two-year-long build up for the 2012 Summer Olympics, she elected to compete in full adult competition instead of the under-23 events she was normally entitled to enter. This was in order to enhance her chances of competing at the Games.

At the World Cup event in Dalby Forest during May 2011, she finished a career best of 14th place. At the first World Cup event of 2012, in Pietermaritzburg, South Africa, she placed ninth, although at one point she was leading the race. She finished one place better, in 8th place, at the World Cup event in La Bresse, and later another 9th-place finish in Windham in the United States.

Her qualification for the 2012 Olympics came down to the World Cup event in La Bresse in May 2012. Great Britain did not get an automatic qualification spot for the women's mountain biking event, and so finishes in international events were required for the team to gain a place at the Games in the event. She finished eighth at the event, giving Great Britain a spot at the Olympics in her event, and was expected to be announced in the British team for the Games. Her place in the women's cross country was later confirmed along with Liam Killeen, who will compete in the men's competition.

In March, 2017, Last took part in the eight-day Absa Cape Epic stage race for the first time and finished second with South African partner Mariske Strauss. It was Last’s first Cape Epic, which takes place in the Western Cape, South Africa, every year. The 2017 route was 651 km in total. She continued her good form later that season by taking her first UCI Mountain Bike World Cup win in Lenzerheide, Switzerland in July, becoming the first British woman to win a cross-country World Cup event since Caroline Alexander's victory in Sankt Wendel, Germany in 1997. She went on to finish second at the 2017 UCI Mountain Bike World Championships in Cairns, Australia in September, becoming the first British female medallist in the elite cross-country event. Annie Last and her partner Mariske Strauss worked to stay on GC podium at the 2018 Cape Epic after Strauss fell ill before the second last stage. Last broke through Canada's hold of, and earning England's first Commonwealth Games gold medal in the women's cross country at the 2018 Gold Coast Commonwealth Games.

She has been a member of professional mountain bike teams Milka-Superior, Trek Factory Racing, and Silverback  OMX Pro Team.
 She currently races for KMC-Ekoï-SR Suntour.

Personal life
Last has deferred attending university to study medicine in order to be a professional mountain biker. Her brother, Tom, was also a professional mountain bike and road cyclist before becoming a presenter for Global Cycling Network.

Major results

Cyclo-cross

2006–2007
 National Trophy Series
2nd Cheltenham
3rd Derby
2011–2012
 3rd National CX Championships
2012–2013
 3rd National CX Championships
2014–2015
 3rd National CX Championships
2021–2022
 2nd National CX Championships
 National Trophy Series
3rd Gravesend

Mountain Bike

2008
 1st  Cross-country, National Junior Championships
2010
 1st  Cross-country, National Championships
 2nd  Cross-country, UCI World Under-23 Championships
2011
 1st  Cross-country, National Championships
 2nd  Cross-country, UCI World Under-23 Championships
2012
 BMC Racing Cup
1st Basel
1st Davos
 National XC Series
1st Dalby Forest
1st Sherwood Pines
 UCI XCO World Cup
3rd Val d'Isère
2014
 1st  Cross-country, National Championships
 National XC Series
2nd Sherwood Pines
2015
 1st  Cross-country, National Championships
 National XC Series
1st Glasgow
1st Plymouth
2016
 1st  Cross-country, National Championships
 National XC Series
2nd Dalby Forest
2017
 1st  Cross-country, National Championships
 UCI XCO World Cup
1st Lenzerheide
 National XC Series
1st Dalby Forest
 2nd  Cross-country, UCI World Championships
 2nd Overall Cape Epic (with Mariske Strauss)
1st Stage 6
2018
 1st  Cross country, Commonwealth Games
 1st  Cross-country, National Championships
 National XC Series
1st Dalby Forest
 3rd Overall Cape Epic (with Mariske Strauss)
2019
 1st  Cross-country, National Championships
 Copa Catalana Internacional
1st Banyoles
 National XC Series
1st Cannock Chase
1st Sherwood Pines
 UCI XCC World Cup
2nd Nové Město
 UCI XCO World Cup
3rd Snowshoe
2020
 Copa Catalana Internacional
3rd Banyoles
2021
 UCI XCC World Cup
3rd Albstadt
2022
 National XCO Championships
1st  Cross-country
1st  Short track
 National XC Series
1st Newcastleton
 2nd  Marathon, UCI World Championships
 Copa Catalana Internacional
3rd Banyoles

References

External links

 
 
 
 
 
 
 
 Annie Last at MTB Cross Country

1990 births
Living people
English female cyclists
British female cyclists
Cross-country mountain bikers
Cyclo-cross cyclists
Olympic cyclists of Great Britain
Cyclists at the 2012 Summer Olympics
Commonwealth Games medallists in cycling
Commonwealth Games gold medallists for England
Cyclists at the 2014 Commonwealth Games
People from Bakewell
Sportspeople from Derbyshire
21st-century English women
Medallists at the 2018 Commonwealth Games